N-Nitroso-N-methylurea (NMU) is a highly reliable carcinogen, mutagen, and teratogen. NMU is an alkylating agent, and exhibits its toxicity by transferring its methyl group to nucleobases in nucleic acids, which can lead to AT:GC transition mutations.

NMU is the traditional precursor in the synthesis of diazomethane. It has the potentially advantageous property that the stoichiometric byproducts formed are water, carbon dioxide, and ammonia, which are innocuous or easily removed.  However, because it is unstable at temperatures beyond 20 °C and somewhat shock-sensitive, it has become obsolete for this purpose and replaced by other N-nitroso compounds: (N-methyl)nitrosamides and nitrosamines. Most chemical supply houses have stopped carrying it.

Acute exposure to NMU in humans can result in skin and eye irritation, headache, nausea, and vomiting. NMU is reasonably anticipated to be a human carcinogen based on sufficient evidence of carcinogenicity in experimental animals (IARC 1972, 1978, 1987). Various cancers induced in animal models include: squamous cell carcinomas of the forestomach, sarcomas and gliomas of the brain, adenocarcinomas of the pancreas, mammary carcinomas, leukemia, and lymphomas. However, the actual potential for human exposure is quite limited, as the chemical is not produced or used in large quantities 

NMU is teratogenic and embryotoxic, resulting in craniofacial (cleft palate) and skeletal defects, fetal growth retardation, and increased fetal resorption. Exposure to NMU during pre-implantation, post-implantation, organogenesis, or by paternal exposure can result in these effects.

References

External links

Carcinogens
Embryotoxicants
IARC Group 2A carcinogens
Male-mediated teratogens
Mutagens
Nitrosamines
Nitrosoureas
Teratogens
Ureas
Methylating agents